Peter Nettekoven (born 21 January 1940) is a German wrestler. He competed in the men's Greco-Roman 78 kg at the 1968 Summer Olympics.

References

External links
 

1940 births
Living people
German male sport wrestlers
Olympic wrestlers of West Germany
Wrestlers at the 1968 Summer Olympics
Sportspeople from Bonn